Pacific Forum is a Honolulu-based foreign policy research institute focused on the Indo-Pacific. Founded in 1975, the Pacific forum collaborates with a network of research institutes from around the Pacific Rim, drawing on Asian perspectives and disseminating project findings and recommendations to global leaders, governments, and members of the public. Pacific Forum is non partisan and does not engage in classified work.

History
Pacific Forum was founded in 1975 with a mission of establishing “a Forum in the Pacific under the auspices of the private sector for a continuing trans-Pacific private dialogue and consultation among the developing and developed countries of the Pacific area.”

Pacific Forum’s founder, Lloyd R. Vasey (1917-2018), retired from the US Navy as a Rear Admiral in 1972 after serving as chief strategist (J-5) for US Pacific Command under Admiral John S. McCain Jr.

From 1989 to 2018, Pacific Forum was an affiliate of the Center for Strategic and International Studies. During the 1989 merger, Pacific Forum retained its name, own board, independent program agenda, and funding responsibility. Today, Pacific Forum is a fully independent research institute with a full-time staff of 12, a rotating resident research fellow cohort of approximately 5-8 people, and an annual budget of approximately $2.8 million.

Regional Engagement Program
The Pacific Forum’s Regional Engagement Program conducts outreach efforts to scholars and the public at large in Japan, South Korea, and Australia on various foreign and security policy issues in the Indo-Pacific. The Regional Engagement Program also focuses on nonproliferation in the Indo-Pacific, including in Myanmar.

Strategic Stability Program 
The Pacific Forum promotes strategic stability in the region primarily through a series of Track 1.5 dialogues focused on affirming US commitments to its alliance partners and maintaining a strategic balance in the Indo-Pacific.

Security Cooperation Program
The Pacific Forum’s program on security cooperation in the Indo-Pacific is organized around its membership in the Council for Security Cooperation in the Asia Pacific (CSCAP). Pacific Forum is one of the founding institutions of the CSCAP and manages its US member committee. The security cooperation program assesses and promotes security cooperation relating to the proliferation and nonproliferation of weapons of mass destruction, strategic trade controls, maritime security, counter-terrorism, transnational crime, and cyber security.

Young Leaders Program

The Young Leaders Program was established in 2004 to train young professionals in international policy affairs at an early juncture in their careers. Currently, the organization’s network of Young Leaders consists of more than 1,000 members from 56 countries.

Publications
Pacific Forum produces three regular publications from the organization’s own research as well as by external authors. These publications include:

 Comparative Connections (http://cc.pacforum.org/) 
 Issues and Insights (https://pacforum.org/programs/issues-insights)  
 PacNet Commentaries (https://pacforum.org/programs/pacnet-commentary).

Budget
Pacific Forum’s funding comes from grants, foundations, governments, corporations and individuals. In 2019, Pacific Forum reported a budget of $2.8 million.

References

Foreign policy and strategy think tanks in the United States